Reggina Calcio did renew its Serie A contract on the second consecutive occasion, ensuring the longest stay of the Calabrian club in the top division of Italian football. With returning coach Franco Colomba not being successful in his third stay at the club, Giancarlo Camolese guided the side to 13th place in the league. With only 29 goals scored, Reggina relied heavily on its defence for the survival, and Martin Jiránek plus defensive midfielder Davide Baiocco strengthened their reputations. After the season, Baiocco returned to Juventus, who in turn loaned him out to Reggina's arch-rivals Messina, newcomers for the 2004–05 season, setting up the first Messina strait derby in the highest division ever.

Squad

Goalkeepers
  Emanuele Belardi
  Martin Lejsal
  Ferdinando Coppola

Defenders
  Gianluca Comotto
  Gianluca Falsini
  Ivan Franceschini
  Andrea Sottil
  Stefano Torrisi
  Martin Jiránek
  Simone Giacchetta
  Gonzalo Martínez
  Giovanni Morabito

Midfielders
  Davide Baiocco
  Carlos Paredes
  Shunsuke Nakamura
  Julio León
  Giacomo Tedesco
  Giandomenico Mesto
  Mozart
  Francesco Cozza

Attackers
  Roberto Stellone
  Emiliano Bonazzoli
  Stefano Dall'Acqua
  David Di Michele

Serie A

Matches

 Reggina-Sampdoria 2-2
 1-0 Francesco Cozza (5)
 2-0 David Di Michele (41)
 2-1 Fabio Bazzani (64)
 2-2 Aimo Diana (73)
 Empoli-Reggina 1-1
 0-1 Mozart (27)
 1-1 Antonio Di Natale (41)
 Brescia-Reggina 4-4
 1-0 Luigi Di Biagio (9)
 1-1 Shunsuke Nakamura (23 pen)
 1-2 Emiliano Bonazzoli (39)
 2-2 Andrea Caracciolo (51)
 3-2 Antonio Filippini (52)
 3-3 Andrea Sottil (61)
 3-4 Shunsuke Nakamura (72)
 4-4 Fabio Petruzzi (86)
 Reggina-Juventus 0-2
 0-1 Marco Di Vaio (13)
 0-2 Pavel Nedvěd (49)
 Perugia-Reggina 0-0
 Reggina-Siena 2-1
 1-0 Mozart (22)
 2-0 Julio León (90 + 3)
 2-1 Tore André Flo (94)
 Reggina-Ancona 0-0
 Roma-Reggina 2-0
 1-0 Vincenzo Montella (17)
 2-0 John Carew (81)
 Reggina-Modena 1-1
 1-0 Stefano Dall'Acqua (31)
 1-1 Nicola Campedelli (45)
 Inter-Reggina 6-0
 1-0 Fabio Cannavaro (33)
 2-0 Obafemi Martins (43)
 3-0 Andy van der Meyde (49)
 4-0 Francisco Farinós (60)
 5-0 Julio Cruz (66)
 6-0 Christian Vieri (75)
 Reggina-Bologna 0-0
 Udinese-Reggina 1-0
 1-0 Carsten Jancker (87)
 Reggina-Chievo 0-0
 Parma-Reggina 1-2
 0-1 David Di Michele (27)
 1-1 Alberto Gilardino (85 pen)
 1-2 Francesco Cozza (90 + 2)
 Reggina-Lazio 2-1
 0-1 Fabio Liverani (16)
 1-1 David Di Michele (60)
 2-1 Francesco Cozza (71)
 Milan-Reggina 3-1
 0-1 Stefano Torrisi (2)
 1-1 Kaká (8)
 2-1 Kaká (55)
 3-1 Andrea Pirlo (71 pen)
 Reggina-Lecce 1-3
 0-1 Valeri Bojinov (2)
 1-1 Francesco Cozza (26)
 1-2 Javier Chevantón (49)
 1-3 Valeri Bojinov (60)
 Sampdoria-Reggina 2-0
 1-0 Fabio Bazzani (45)
 2-0 Fabio Bazzani (47)
 Reggina-Empoli 2-0
 1-0 Francesco Cozza (50 pen)
 2-0 David Di Michele (89 pen)
 Reggina-Brescia 0-0
 Juventus-Reggina 1-0
 1-0 Enzo Maresca (51)
 Reggina-Perugia 1-2
 0-1 Zé Maria (20)
 1-1 Francesco Cozza (53 pen)
 1-2 Dario Hübner (90 + 2)
 Siena-Reggina 0-0
 Ancona-Reggina 1-1
 1-0 Maurizio Ganz (5)
 1-1 David Di Michele (87)
 Reggina-Roma 0-0
 Modena-Reggina 1-2
 0-1 Emiliano Bonazzoli (16)
 0-2 David Di Michele (45 + 1)
 1-2 Diomansy Kamara (50)
 Reggina-Inter 0-2
 0-1 Emiliano Bonazzoli (42 og)
 0-2 Adriano (90 + 3)
 Bologna-Reggina 2-2
 0-1 David Di Michele (8)
 0-2 Roberto Stellone (30)
 1-2 Tomas Locatelli (43)
 2-2 Claudio Bellucci (67)
 Reggina-Udinese 0-1
 0-1 Vincenzo Iaquinta (77)
 Chievo-Reggina 0-0
 Reggina-Parma 1-1
 0-1 Mark Bresciano (9)
 1-1 Stefano Torrisi (48)
 Lazio-Reggina 1-1
 1-0 Claudio López (23)
 1-1 Francesco Cozza (53 pen)
 Reggina-Milan 2-1
 1-0 David Di Michele (8)
 2-0 Francesco Cozza (30 pen)
 2-1 Andriy Shevchenko (52)
 Lecce-Reggina 2-1
 1-0 Javier Chevantón (11)
 1-1 Stefano Dall'Acqua (32)
 2-1 Daniele Franceschini (38)

Topscorers
  David Di Michele 8
  Francesco Cozza 8
  Emiliano Bonazzoli 2
  Stefano Dall'Acqua 2
  Mozart 2
  Stefano Torrisi 2
  Shunsuke Nakamura 2

Sources
  RSSSF - Italy 2003/04

Reggina 1914 seasons
Reggina